Cénacle is the name given to a Parisian literary group of varying constituency that began about 1826 to gather around Charles Nodier. The group sought to revive in French literature the old monarchical spirit, the spirit of medieval mystery and spiritual submission.  The chief members were Vigny and the brothers Deschamps.  They were soon joined by Lamartine, Hugo, and Sainte-Beuve, who describes the group as "royalists by birth, Christians by convention and a vague sentimentality."  Their organ was La Muse Française. Musset, Mérimée, and the elder Dumas were involved within the Cénacle, too.  Time and the revolution of 1830 wrought changes in the attitudes of the members of Cénacle.  Théophile Gautier and Gérard de Nerval were attracted to the group at the time of the revolution, but the reasons for the existence of the Cénacle dissolved. The group lost its reason for existence with the triumph of Hugo's Hernani (1830).

Further reading

Cultural organizations based in France
1826 establishments in France
French male writers